Big Dipper is a wooden roller coaster at Camden Park that opened in 1958.

References

Roller coasters in West Virginia